Eulepte is a genus of moths of the family Crambidae.

Species
Eulepte alialis (Guenée, 1854)
Eulepte anticostalis (Grote, 1871)
Eulepte concordalis Hübner, 1825
Eulepte gastralis (Guenée, 1854)
Eulepte inguinalis (Guenée, 1854)
Eulepte vogli Amsel, 1956

References

Spilomelinae
Crambidae genera
Taxa named by Jacob Hübner